Gapicomine (INN) is a coronary vasodilator. It has been withdrawn from the market in the countries it was used in.

Also, gapicomine is a major component in the drug Bicordin.

History
Gapicomine was discovered in 1970 by Polish chemist Stanisław Biniecki. It was first published about in an article of The Polish Journal of Medicine and Pharmacy describing the derivative drug Bicordin in 1974.

Synthesis

The oxime formation between isonicotinaldehyde [872-85-5] (1)  and hydroxylamine gives 4-Pyridinealdoxime [696-54-8] (2). This is then reduced by catalytic hydrogenation over Raney-Nickel into 4-Picolylamine [3731-53-1] (3). Reductive amination of the last with a second equivalent of isonicotinaldehyde affords gapicomine (4).

References

4-Pyridyl compounds
Vasodilators